Kasaï-Central is one of the 21 new provinces of the Democratic Republic of the Congo created in the 2015 repartitioning.  Kasaï-Central and Kasaï provinces are the result of the dismemberment of the former Kasaï-Occidental province.  Kasaï-Central was formed from the Lulua district and the independently administered city of Kananga which retained its status as a provincial capital.

The new province's territory corresponds to the historic Luluabourg Province which existed in the early period after independence between 1963 and 1966.

Within this province, there are 5 territories which are named:

 Demba                    4. Kazumba
 Dibaya                    5. Luiza
 Dimbelenge

See also
 Kasai region
 Kamwina Nsapu rebellion

References

 01
Provinces of the Democratic Republic of the Congo